Erling Vinne (7 August 1892 – 20 June 1963) was a Norwegian triple jumper. He represented IK Tjalve.

At the 1912 Summer Olympics he finished fourth in the triple jump final with a jump of 14.14 metres. At the 1920 Summer Olympics he finished thirteenth with 13.34 metres. He became Norwegian champion in 1912, 1914 and 1917-1919.

His personal best jump was 14.65 metres, achieved on 23 September 1917 in Kristiania.

References

1892 births
1963 deaths
Norwegian male triple jumpers
Athletes (track and field) at the 1912 Summer Olympics
Athletes (track and field) at the 1920 Summer Olympics
Olympic athletes of Norway